The Ordway Building (also known as One Kaiser Plaza) is a skyscraper located in downtown Oakland, California. The building lies close to Oakland's Lake Merritt and the tower contains 28 stories of office space. There are eight corner offices per floor, since the skyscraper has a H-shaped floor plan. Standing , the tower is the tallest skyscraper in the city and the entire Bay Area outside of San Francisco.

The Ordway Building's main tenant is Kaiser Permanente, which has used the building as its national headquarters since completion in 1970. As of 2009, Kaiser was leasing space on 21 floors. Kaiser announced on August 6, 2009 that it had signed a new nine-year lease with landlord CIM Group.

See also

List of tallest buildings in Oakland, California

References

External links
Official website

Buildings and structures in Oakland, California
Headquarters in the United States
Landmarks in the San Francisco Bay Area
Skyscraper office buildings in Oakland, California
Skidmore, Owings & Merrill buildings
Office buildings completed in 1970